Riki John Flutey (born 10 February 1980) is a retired rugby union player who played internationally for  (winning 14 caps) and the British & Irish Lions (1 cap). Born in Wairarapa, New Zealand, he represented New Zealand in the U19 age group before qualifying to play for England through residency.

He then played for London Irish and London Wasps in England, Brive in France and Ricoh Black Rams in Japan.

Rugby career

Born in Wairarapa, Flutey was a member of the New Zealand team that won the U19 World Cup in 1999. He first played for the New Zealand Māori in 2002.

He made his representative debut for Hawkes Bay in 1998, and from 1999 to 2005 he played for the Wellington Lions in the National Provincial Championship.

Flutey made his debut for the Hurricanes against the Blues in the opening round of the 2002 Super 12.

After making only 5 appearances in the 2005 Super 12 season, Flutey moved to England to play for London Irish.

After his arrival at the Exiles the team achieved a play-off place in the 2005–06 Guinness Premiership, losing to the Leicester Tigers. That season, Flutey also started in the final of the European Challenge Cup, losing to Gloucester Rugby. At the end of the 2006–07 season, Flutey left London Irish to join London Wasps.

He was rewarded for an excellent 2007/2008 début season with Wasps, winning the League, and he was named Player of the Year at the PRA awards.

Flutey decided to join Top 14 club Brive, from the 2009–10 season, joining other English internationals such as Andy Goode, Steve Thompson and Jamie Noon. He played just 5 games for the club before his season was ended by a shoulder injury.

Flutey rejoined London Wasps for the 2010/2011 season after just one season at Brive. He was contracted for 2 years but, by mutual consent, the contract was cancelled as his time in France was blighted by a shoulder injury. He re-injured the same shoulder playing for England in the tournament and was ruled out of playing again during the 2009/2010 season.

At the end of the 2012 season Flutey quit Wasps to join Ricoh Black Rams

England

Flutey qualified for England on residency grounds at the beginning of the 2008/09 season – he had announced on 14 May 2008 that he would be available for England selection as soon as he had completed his three-year residential qualification in September.

On 1 July 2008, Flutey was named in Martin Johnson's first England Elite Squad. Flutey made his England debut against the Pacific Islanders at Twickenham on 8 November 2008. He scored his first international try against  in the 2009 Six Nations.

In the next game against , he scored again and was chosen as the man of the match. His four tries in the 2009 Six Nations was the joint highest.

British & Irish Lions
He was selected for the British & Irish Lions for their 2009 tour to South Africa. On 30 May 2009 he became the first player to play both for and against the Lions in tour matches. He played in the third and final test of the tour.

Assault case
On 3 December 2001 Flutey was charged with grievous bodily harm in Rosario, Argentina. Argentinian teenager Gabriel Capotosti suffered a broken nose and right eye socket that required corrective plastic surgery in an unprovoked assault by Flutey outside a mini mart. Consequently, Flutey spent four nights in a police cell, then under house arrest at the team's hotel while the Wellington union arranged his bail of $US35,000 ($NZ84,800), before returning to New Zealand on 10 December 2001. Gabriel Capotosti's family later filed a civil suit against Flutey. The case was finally settled in December 2008, with the charges completely dropped on condition that Flutey does not reoffend for a set period.

References

External links
England profile
British & Irish Lions profile
Wasps profile

1980 births
Living people
English rugby union players
New Zealand rugby union players
Hurricanes (rugby union) players
London Irish players
Wasps RFC players
CA Brive players
England international rugby union players
British & Irish Lions rugby union players from England
Rugby union centres
Rugby union fly-halves
Māori All Blacks players
Ngāi Tahu people
Naturalised citizens of the United Kingdom
New Zealand emigrants to the United Kingdom
English expatriate sportspeople in France
Expatriate rugby union players in France
People educated at Te Aute College
Wellington rugby union players
English expatriate rugby union players
British & Irish Lions rugby union players from New Zealand
Black Rams Tokyo players
Expatriate rugby union players in Japan